The 2011 Fukuoka International Women's Cup was a professional tennis tournament played on carpet courts. It was part of the 2011 ITF Women's Circuit. It took place in Fukuoka, Japan between 2 and 9 May 2011.

Singles entrants

Seeds

 Rankings are as of April 25, 2010.

Other entrants
The following players received wildcards into the singles main draw:
  Miyu Kato 
  Aiko Nakamura 
  Yumi Nakano 
  Akiko Yonemura

The following players received entry from the qualifying draw:
  Miyabi Inoue
  Kazusa Ito
  Miki Miyamura
  Erika Takao

Champions

Singles

 Tamarine Tanasugarn def.  Chan Yung-jan, 6–4, 5–7, 7–5

Doubles

 Shuko Aoyama /  Rika Fujiwara def.  Aiko Nakamura /  Junri Namigata, 7–6(3), 6–0

External links
Official Website
ITF Search

Fukuoka International Women's Cup
Fukuoka International Women's Cup
2011 in Japanese women's sport
2011 in Japanese tennis